Norman Treigle (né Adanelle Wilfred Treigle (March 6, 1927February 16,  1975) was an American operatic bass-baritone, who was acclaimed for his great abilities as a singing-actor, and specialized in roles that evoked villainy and terror.

Biography
Treigle was born in New Orleans, the fifth and final child of a poor carpenter and his wife.  Following his 1946 marriage to the former Loraine Siegel, the bass-baritone began vocal studies with the contralto Elisabeth Wood.  In 1947, he made his operatic debut with the New Orleans Opera Association, as the Duke of Verona in Roméo et Juliette.

Between 1949 and 1951, he attended Loyola University of the South's College of Music, while performing various roles with the local opera company. (Loyola's archives now preserve Treigle's personal papers.)

In 1953, Treigle made his New York City Opera debut, as Colline in La bohème.  Three years later, the bass-baritone scored his first significant success, as the tormented Reverend Olin Blitch, in the New York premiere of Floyd's Susannah. He made his European debut in this same opera, at the Brussels World's Fair, in 1958.

In succeeding seasons, Treigle became arguably the top bass-baritone of the Americas, and was acclaimed as one of the world's foremost singing-actors.  He sang in many experimental productions and participated in several important premieres, in operas by Einem, Copland, Moore, Floyd, Orff, Dallapiccola and Ward (The Crucible).  Perhaps his greatest roles were in Faust (as Méphistophélès), Carmen (as Escamillo), Susannah, Il prigioniero, Les contes d'Hoffmann (the four Villains), Boris Godunov and, especially, Mefistofele.

In the autumn of 1974, Treigle made his debut at Covent Garden in a new production of Faust. On February 16, 1975, Treigle was found dead in his New Orleans apartment. He had been diagnosed as a chronic insomniac, and it was determined that he had consumed an accidental overdose of sleeping pills. By his first wife (who died in 2013), he had a son (who died in 1993) and a daughter, Phyllis. He had also adopted the daughter of his second wife, from whom he was separated at the time of his death.

Phyllis Treigle is a soprano who appeared with the New Orleans Opera and the New York City Opera.

Treigle Plaza 
On October 12, 2012, Treigle Plaza was dedicated, in the presence of Phyllis Treigle and Audrey Schuh.  It is the elevated area in front of the Mahalia Jackson Theater of the Performing Arts, in New Orleans, including the great fountain.  The Dedication ceremony preceded a Gala Concert, by the New Orleans Opera, starring Plácido Domingo, with Patricia Clarkson as hostess.

Trivia 
 A fragment of the Treigle voice is heard in the 2005 Warner Bros. film, Batman Begins, directed by Christopher Nolan.  The young Bruce Wayne and his parents are seen attending a performance of Mefistofele in Gotham City, and the recording used is EMI's 1973 set.

Selected discography of studio recordings 
 Copland: The Tender Land: abridged (Clements, Cassilly, Fredricks; Copland, 1965) Columbia Records
 Handel: Giulio Cesare (Sills, Forrester; Rudel, 1967) RCA Victor
 Floyd: Pilgrimage: excerpts (Torkanowsky, 1971) Orion
 Offenbach: Les contes d'Hoffmann (Sills, Marsee, Burrows; Rudel, 1972) Westminster (Deutsche Grammophon)
 Boito: Mefistofele (Caballé, Domingo; Rudel, 1973) EMI

Selected approved "live" recordings 
 Puccini: La bohème (Albanese, Schuh, di Stefano, Valdengo; Cellini, 1959) VAI
 Dallapiccola: Il prigioniero (McKnight, Cassilly; Stokowski, 1960) Opera Depot
 Floyd: Susannah (Curtin, Cassilly; Andersson, 1962) VAI
 Floyd: The Sojourner and Mollie Sinclair (Neway; Rudel, 1963) VAI
 Floyd: Markheim (Schuh, Crofoot; Andersson, 1966) VAI
 Handel: Giulio Cesare: excerpts (Sills; Richter, 1968) VAI
 Gounod: Faust (Sills, Costa-Greenspon, Molese, Cossa; Rudel, 1968) Opera Depot

Commercial videography 
 Floyd: Susannah: Revival Scene (Yestadt, Treigle, 1958) [live] Bel Canto Society

References
 Strange Child of Chaos: Norman Treigle, by Brian Morgan, iUniverse, 2006.  
 "The Demon Within," by Ira Siff, Opera News, March 2013.

External links 
 .
 .
 The Norman Treigle Appreciation Society .
 The Norman Treigle Papers Finding Aid at Loyola University New Orleans

1927 births
1975 deaths
Loyola University New Orleans alumni
20th-century American male opera singers
Musicians from New Orleans
Operatic bass-baritones
American bass-baritones
Singers from Louisiana
Accidental deaths in Louisiana
Drug-related deaths in Louisiana